Narceolaelaps is a genus of mites in the family Laelapidae.

Species
 Narceolaelaps americanus Kethley, 1978     
 Narceolaelaps annularis J. B. Kethley, 1978     
 Narceolaelaps burdicki Kethley, 1978     
 Narceolaelaps gordanus Kethley, 1978

References

Laelapidae